Tsaraphycis libanoticella is a species of snout moth in the genus Tsaraphycis. It was described by Zerny in 1934. It is found in Lebanon and Turkey.

References

Moths described in 1934
Phycitinae
Insects of Turkey